Luboš Račanský (born 13 March 1964) is a Czech sport shooter who competed for Czechoslovakia. He won the Bronze medal in 10 metre running target in Barcelona in the 1992 Summer Olympics in Barcelona. Račanský was born in Benešov.

References

People from Benešov
Shooters at the 1988 Summer Olympics
Shooters at the 1992 Summer Olympics
Shooters at the 1996 Summer Olympics
Olympic medalists in shooting
Olympic bronze medalists for Czechoslovakia
ISSF rifle shooters
Czechoslovak male sport shooters
Czech male sport shooters
Olympic shooters of Czechoslovakia
Olympic shooters of the Czech Republic
1964 births
Living people
Medalists at the 1992 Summer Olympics
Sportspeople from the Central Bohemian Region